Nha Trang Station is one of the main station on the North–South railway (Reunification railways). This station is located at 17 Thai Nguyen, Phuoc Tan ward, Nha Trang, Khánh Hòa province. It serves the city of Nha Trang.

History 
This station was opened on September 2nd 1936. This is the second of the most beautiful railway station in Indochina when It's was completed, the most beautiful is Đà Lạt station. Nha Trang station is the place that people of Nha Trang start to fight against the French Indochina. Now, Nha Trang station still keep the French architecture. In front of the station, there is a park named Vo Van Ky park, at the time this station was opened, this park is a large garden of the railway station. There are two same building on the two sides of the station.

Station relocation 
Now, this station can be relocate. There are two options to relocate the station:

 Keep the station as the passenger trains station and build another new freight trains station in the suburbs area.
 Move all of the station to the new railway station in Vĩnh Trung, Nha Trang, Khánh Hòa.

References

Nha Trang
Railway stations in Vietnam
Buildings and structures in Khánh Hòa province